{{Automatic taxobox
| fossil_range = 
| image = Perisphinctes ammonite.jpg
| image_caption = Exhibit from the Museum of Natural History in Berlin.
| taxon = Perisphinctes
| authority = Waagen, 1869
| subdivision_ranks = Species
| subdivision_ref = 
| subdivision = * P. abadiensis
 P. arussiorum

 P. birmensdorfensis
 P. choffati

 P. gallarum

 P. hillebrandti
 P. jubailensis
 P. parandieri
 P. picteti
 P. roubyanus
 P. stenocyclus
 P. variocostatus
| type_species = Ammonites variocostatus| type_species_authority = Buckland, 1836
}}Perisphinctes is an extinct genus of ammonite cephalopod. They lived during the Middle to Late Jurassic epochs and serve as an index fossil for that time period. The species P. boweni'' was named after the English chemist and geologist E. J. Bowen (1898–1980).

Distribution
Shells of species belonging to this genus have been found in the Jurassic of Antarctica, Argentina, Chile, Cuba, Egypt, Ethiopia, France, Germany, Hungary, India, Iran, Italy, Japan, Madagascar, Poland, Portugal, Russia, Saudi Arabia, Spain, Switzerland, the United Kingdom and Yemen.

Gallery

References

Ammonitida genera
Perisphinctidae
Late Jurassic ammonites
Late Jurassic ammonites of Europe
Ammonites of Africa
Jurassic animals of Africa
Ammonites of Asia
Jurassic Asia
Ammonites of South America
Jurassic Argentina
Jurassic Chile
Fossil taxa described in 1869
Callovian first appearances
Late Jurassic extinctions